Anna Kanakis (born in 1962 in Messina, Italy) is an Italian actress and model.

Early life
Kanakis was born in Messina on 1 February 1962 to a Greek father from Crete and a mother from Messina.

She was Miss Italy in 1977 at only 15 years old. She made her last appearance in 1981.

Career

Acting
Kanakis' worked in cinema as early as 1980, in a couple of minor films before picking up more recognized credits in 1983. By 1989, her career transitioned to consistent work on television in series and features.

Literary works
Kanakis wrote You're So Mine When You Sleep.

Politics
Kanakis had a stint as national leader of Culture and Entertainment in the Democratic Union for the Republic.

Personal life
Kanakis was previously married in 1981 to composer Carlo Simonetti. The marriage only lasted few years after 1981. She has since 2004 been married to Marco Merati Foscarini a descendant of one of the last doges of Venice. Kanakis has no children.

Selected filmography

Film

Television

References

External links 
Official site

1962 births
20th-century Italian actresses
21st-century Italian actresses
Italian beauty pageant winners
Italian female models
Italian film actresses
Italian people of Greek descent
Italian television actresses
Living people
Miss Europe
Miss Universe 1981 contestants
Actors from Messina
Models from Sicily